FC Saxan Gagauz Yeri is a Moldovan football club based in Ceadîr-Lunga, Gagauzia, Moldova. They play in the Divizia B, the third tier of Moldovan football.

History

Domestic history

European history

Notes
 1Q: First qualifying round

Honours
Divizia A
Champions (1): 2013–14
Divizia B
Champions (1): 2010–11

External links
Saxan Ceadîr-Lunga  at weltfussballarchiv.com
Saxan Ceadîr-Lunga at Soccerway.com

 
Football clubs in Moldova
Football clubs in Gagauzia
Association football clubs established in 2010
2010 establishments in Moldova
Association football clubs disestablished in 2022
2022 disestablishments in Moldova